Yury Alexandrovich Kokov  (born August 13, 1955, in Nalchik)  is a Russian politician who was served as Head of Kabardino-Balkaria from 2013 to 2018.

Biography 
Kokov graduated from the Law Department of Rostov State University and joined the agencies of the Ministry of Internal Affairs of the Kabardino-Balkarian ASSR in 1979.

Until 1999 he held various positions in criminal investigation units, in the Council of Ministers and the Ministry of Internal Affairs.

In 1999 he was transferred to work in Moscow.

On December 6, 2013 he was appointed Acting Head of the Kabardino-Balkarian Republic.

On October 9, 2014, deputies of the parliament of Kabardino-Balkaria unanimously elected Kokov as head of the republic.

In September 2018 Vladimir Putin appointed Yuri Kokov as Deputy Secretary of the Security Council of Russia.

Family 
Married. Wife Zhanna Kokova (Babaeva), notary. Has two daughters.

References 
 Официальный сайт Главы и Правительства Кабарди́но-Балка́рская Республики

External links
 

1955 births
Living people
1st class Active State Councillors of the Russian Federation
People from Nalchik
Kabardino-Balkaria
Heads of the Kabardino-Balkarian Republic
United Russia politicians
21st-century Russian politicians
Circassian people of Russia
Russian Sunni Muslims